Kyle Hatherell (born 3 April 1995) is a South African rugby union player who plays for Worcester Warriors in the Premiership Rugby competition.

Hatherell was born and raised in South Africa but is England qualified. He previously played for Varsity College and Sharks at Under-21s in South Africa. He also played for Marr in Scotland's Super 6 competition.

On 3 April 2018, it was confirmed that Hatherell signed for Jersey Reds in the RFU Championship from the 2018–19 season.  He made his debut for Jersey against Coventry in September 2018.

On 16 March 2021, Hatherell left Jersey with immediate effect as he signs for Worcester Warriors in the Premiership Rugby. Hatherell made his debut as a replacement in the defeat by Exeter Chiefs at Sandy Park the following month. He scored his first try for Warriors against Gloucester Rugby at Sixways in October 2021.

References

External links
Worcester Warriors Profile
Its Rugby Profile

1995 births
Living people
South African rugby union players
Worcester Warriors players
Jersey Reds players
Rugby union locks